Ernakulam District is a district of the state of Kerala in southern India.

Institutions of higher learning in Ernakulam District
 School of Engineering, CUSAT
 St. Teresa's College
 Maharaja's College
 Sacred Heart College, Thevara
St. Albert's College
 Cochin University
Rajagiri College of Social Sciences
 Mar Athanasius College, Kothamangalam
 Mar Athanasius College of Engineering, Kothamangalam
Rajagiri School of Engineering & Technology 
 SCMS School of Engineering and Technology
Amrita Institute of Medical Sciences
Amrita School of Arts and Science
School of Communication and Management Studies
 Model Engineering College
Central Institute of Fisheries Nautical and Engineering Training
Central Marine Fisheries Research Institute
RLV College of Music
Toc H Institute of Science and Technology
 Cochin College
 Indira Gandhi Group of Institutions
 Xavier Institute of Management and Entrepreneurship
 CBSE Centre of Excellence Kochi

Primary education 
The pattern of primary education is essentially the same all over the state. There are government owned schools and government aided schools, which are affiliated to the Kerala State Education Board. A few privately owned schools are also affiliated to the system. Most of the schools owned by private organisations or individuals are affiliated to the Central Board for Secondary Education (CBSE). Indian Certificate of Secondary Education (ICSE) have some schools affiliated to them as well. The state education board offers both Malayalam and English medium instruction, while the other boards offer English medium alone. There are a few schools that follow international curricula, such as IB and IGCSE.

There 34 government schools, 67 private aided schools and 31 unaided schools affiliated to the Kerala State Education Board in the city and suburbs. There are 62 CBSE Schools, 2 IGCSE and 9 ICSE Schools as well.

The general pattern of education is ten years of common schooling to reach the secondary level. Kindegartens are widely available, but considered separate from formal schooling, and generally unregulated. After the secondary level, three streams, namely Arts, Commerce or Science are offered for higher secondary education. After finishing the school, students can opt for higher education related to the streams they had undergone for higher secondary schooling.

The notable schools in the government sector are Sree Rama Varma High School, Edappally High School, Government School-Kochi and Govt Girls Higher Secondary School in Kacheripady. There are Kendriya Vidyalaya, Chinmaya Mission and Bharatiya Vidya Bhavan run several quasi-private charter schools within the city limits, as well as in the suburbs. There are several fully private schools that are owned by secular and religious trusts which are of particular renown, such as Asoka World School, The Delta Study, Rajagiri Public School, Campion School, Assisi Vidyaniketan, Cochin Refineries School, Gregorian Public School, Greets Public School, Toc-H Public School, Global Public School, Choice School, Vidyodaya School, Mar Thoma Public School, Nava Nirman Public School and St. Pauls International School, Kalamassery, The Charter School Kochi.

See also
 Ernakulam town
 Ernakulam district

References

Lists of universities and colleges in Kerala
Education in Ernakulam district